The women's 800 metres event at the 2021 European Athletics U23 Championships was held in Tallinn, Estonia, at Kadriorg Stadium on 8 and 10 July.

Records
Prior to the competition, the records were as follows:

Results

Round 1
Qualification rule:  First 2 in each heat (Q) and the next 2 fastest (q) advance to the Final.

Final

References

800 metres
800 metres at the European Athletics U23 Championships